Notre-Dame-des-Champs (Our Lady of the Fields) is a rural community on the northern edge of Mer Bleue in Ottawa, Ontario, Canada. Prior to 2001 amalgamation, it was on the border between Cumberland and Gloucester. Today, it is on the border between Cumberland Ward and Innes Ward. The population is about 1000.

Neighbourhoods in Ottawa